Joy Enriquez is the debut studio album from American singer Joy Enriquez. The album was released in September 2001.

Critical reception

Jonathan Widran from AllMusic said; "She's given great intensely hooky surefire pop hits written and produced by heavyweights like Soulshock & Karlin and Babyface, and there's even a fun little gem with a perky Latin groove "Shake up the Party" to pay homage to her heritage and yes, she can sing, sometimes sensually, sometimes showing some range that could hint at a poor man's Mariah Carey-type niche, but really, this rises on the success of the grooves and hooks. "What Do You Want" is a bouncy declaration that she's giving listeners the best she can, so they have to admire that. "Tell Me How You Feel" has a classic soul feel, with a few Mariah Carey-like moments. The first ballad, "Without You," gives her voice a shot to soar, which helps temper the clichés. Overall, lots of fun, and the pink packaging helps listeners think "party." Pop music and this type of stuff in particular being fickle as it is, the question will be how long Enriquez can keep the party going."

Track listing

Note
 NB: Tracks 1 and 11 were included on the US release only.
Sample credits

"Tell Me How You Feel" contains an excerpt from "Mellow Mellow Right on" as performed by Lowrell.
"With This Love" contains excerpts from "The Planets" as composed by Gustav Holst.

Charts

References

2001 debut albums
Arista Records albums
Albums produced by Babyface (musician)